MDQ may refer to:
 Astor Piazzolla International Airport (IATA designator MDQ), Mar del Plata in Argentina
 Mbole language (ISO 639:mdq), a Bantu language of the Democratic Republic of the Congo
 Mood Disorder Questionnaire, a self-report questionnaire designed to help detect bipolar disorder
 Mother's Day Quarry, a Diplodocus fossil site in Montana
 Quito Metro (in Spanish, Metro de Quito), a Metro system due to open in the Ecuadorian capital in 2016